Bob Jungels (born 22 September 1992) is a Luxembourgish road bicycle racer, who rides for UCI WorldTeam .

Career
Born in Rollingen, Mersch, Luxembourg, Jungels competed in the Tour de France for the first time in 2015, as part of the UCI World Tour team , finishing 27th overall and 5th in the young rider classification.

Etixx–Quick-Step (2016–20)
He was named in the start list for the 2016 Giro d'Italia where he finished sixth overall and won the young rider classification.

In 2017 he confirmed his ambitions in the general classification by finishing 8th in the Giro d'Italia. He also defended the young rider classification from the previous edition. Only Vladimir Poulnikov and Pavel Tonkov won the classification in consecutive years before him. In the process he was able to take stage 15 and became the first rider from Luxembourg, since Charly Gaul 56 years earlier, to win at the Giro d'Italia.

In 2018, Jungels won Liège–Bastogne–Liège after a solo attack on the Côte de la Roche-aux-Faucons.

AG2R Citroën Team (2021–22)

His first season with the French squad was hampered first by a back injury and then a head injury suffered in a crash in the Amstel Gold Race. Then in June 2021 the team announced that he would miss the Tour de France and the COVID-19 pandemic-delayed 2020 Summer Olympics for surgery for iliac artery endofibrosis. He returned to competition after a 93-day absence at the Tour de Luxembourg in September.

Jungels regained his title at the Luxembourgish National Time Trial Championships in 2022, finishing around half a minute faster than any other competitor over the  course in Nospelt. Following this success, Jungels' next race was the Tour de France – prior to the race, he tested positive for COVID-19 on the two days prior to the opening individual time trial stage, but was allowed to compete by both the Union Cycliste Internationale (UCI) and race organisers Amaury Sport Organisation (ASO). After finishing in the top-ten placings in the sprint finish on stage eight, Jungels got into the breakaway on the following stage. On the day's third categorised climb, the Col de la Croix, Jungels attacked the breakaway group with  left to climb. Jungels eventually soloed to victory as the race returned to France, finishing 22 seconds clear of Jonathan Castroviejo in Châtel, to become the first cyclist from Luxembourg to win a stage since Andy Schleck in 2011. He ultimately finished the race in 12th place overall.

Bora–Hansgrohe
In August 2022, it was announced that Jungels was to join  for the 2023 season, on an initial two-year contract with an option for a further year.

Career achievements

Major results
Source:

2009
 National Junior Road Championships
1st  Road race
1st  Time trial
 1st  Junior race, National Cyclo-cross Championships
 2nd  Time trial, UEC European Junior Road Championships
 2nd Overall Grand Prix Rüebliland
 4th Overall Tour de Lorraine
1st Stage 4 (ITT)
 5th Overall 3-Etappen-Rundfahrt
1st Stage 1 (ITT)
2010
 1st  Time trial, UCI Junior Road World Championships
 National Junior Road Championships
1st  Road race
1st  Time trial
 1st  Junior race, National Cyclo-cross Championships
 1st  Overall Grand Prix Rüebliland
1st  Mountains classification
1st  Points classification
 1st  Overall Vuelta al Besaya
1st  Points classification
1st Stages 1 & 4
 1st  Overall Keizer der Juniores Koksijde
1st Stages 1 & 2a (ITT)
 1st  Overall 3-Etappen-Rundfahrt
1st Stage 1 (ITT)
 1st  Mountains classification, GP Patton
 2nd Overall Trofeo Karlsberg
 3rd Overall Niedersachsen Rundfahrt Juniors
2011
 Games of the Small States of Europe
1st  Road race
1st  Time trial
 National Under-23 Road Championships
1st  Road race
1st  Time trial
 UEC European Under-23 Road Championships
2nd  Time trial
10th Road race
 3rd Overall Flèche du Sud
1st  Young rider classification
2012
 1st  Time trial, National Under-23 Road Championships
 1st  Overall Flèche du Sud
1st  Young rider classification
1st Stage 4 (ITT)
 1st  Overall Le Triptyque des Monts et Châteaux
1st  Points classification
 1st Paris–Roubaix Espoirs
 1st Stage 4 Giro della Valle d'Aosta
 2nd  Time trial, UEC European Under-23 Road Championships
 2nd Overall Giro della Regione Friuli Venezia Giulia
1st  Young rider classification
 2nd La Côte Picarde
 7th Chrono Champenois
 8th Overall Toscana-Terra di Ciclismo
 9th Overall Tour de Luxembourg
2013
 National Road Championships
1st  Road race
1st  Time trial
 1st Gran Premio Nobili Rubinetterie
 5th Overall Tour de Luxembourg
1st Stage 4
2014
 2nd Time trial, National Road Championships
 9th Overall Critérium International
  Combativity award Stage 17 Vuelta a España
2015
 National Road Championships
1st  Road race
1st  Time trial
 1st  Overall Étoile de Bessèges
1st Stage 5 (ITT)
 6th Overall Tour de Suisse
 10th Overall Vuelta a Andalucía
2016
 UCI Road World Championships
1st  Team time trial
10th Time trial
 National Road Championships
1st  Road race
1st  Time trial
 1st Stage 1 Tour of Oman
 3rd Overall Tirreno–Adriatico
1st  Young rider classification
 6th Overall Giro d'Italia
1st  Young rider classification
Held  after Stages 10–12
 10th Overall Eneco Tour
2017
 National Road Championships
1st  Road race
2nd Time trial
 1st  Young rider classification, Tirreno–Adriatico
 8th Overall Giro d'Italia
1st  Young rider classification
1st Stage 15
Held  after Stages 4–8
 8th Overall Tour de Romandie
2018
 1st  Team time trial, UCI Road World Championships
 National Road Championships
1st  Road race
1st  Time trial
 1st Liège–Bastogne–Liège
 1st Prologue Okolo Slovenska
 3rd La Drôme Classic
 5th Overall Volta ao Algarve
 5th Overall Tour of Britain
 7th Vuelta a Murcia
2019
 National Road Championships
1st  Road race
1st  Time trial
 1st Kuurne–Brussels–Kuurne
 1st Stage 4 Tour Colombia
 3rd Dwars door Vlaanderen
 5th E3 Binckbank Classic
 8th Overall Paris–Nice
2020
 National Road Championships
1st  Time trial
2nd Road race
2022
 1st  Time trial, National Road Championships
 1st Stage 9 Tour de France
 6th Overall Tour de Suisse

General classification results timeline

Classics results timeline

Honours and awards
In 2010, Jungels was the winner of the Prix du Jeune Espoir Luxembourgeois. In 2018, Jungels was the men's winner at the Luxembourgish Sportspeople of the Year awards.

References

External links

 
 
 
 
 

1992 births
Living people
Luxembourgian male cyclists
Sportspeople from Luxembourg City
Luxembourgian Tour de France stage winners
Luxembourgian Giro d'Italia stage winners